The Phoenix Skyblazer is an American helicopter that was designed by the Nolan brothers and produced by Phoenix Rotorcraft of Fallston, Maryland and more recently Louisburg, North Carolina. When it was available the aircraft was supplied as a complete ready-to-fly-aircraft.

While advertised for sale in 2011, by February 2013 the aircraft was no longer listed as being available on the manufacturer's website. By January 2015 the company was offering a new gyroplane using the same name, spelled SkyBlazer, as the previous helicopter design. The company website domain subsequently expired and the company is likely no longer in business.

Design and development
The Skyblazer features two coaxial, contra-rotating main rotors, a single-seat open cockpit without a windshield, skid-type landing gear and two twin-cylinder, air-cooled, two-stroke, dual-ignition  Rotax 503 engines for redundancy. The two engines were provided due to the aircraft lacking collective pitch control, thus precluding an autorotation in the event of a power loss. The aircraft can reportedly hover on one engine.

The aircraft fuselage is made from welded steel tubing. Directional control is achieved by tilting the rotor mast.

Operational history
In October 2022 there was one example registered in the United States with the Federal Aviation Administration.

Specifications (Skyblazer)

References

External links
Official website archives on Archive.org

2000s United States sport aircraft
2000s United States helicopters
Twin-engined piston helicopters
Coaxial rotor helicopters
Skyblazer